Rodney Johnson (24 August 1927 – 4 June 2016) was an Australian sports shooter. He competed at the 1956, 1960 and 1964 Summer Olympics.

References

1927 births
2016 deaths
Australian male sport shooters
Olympic shooters of Australia
Shooters at the 1956 Summer Olympics
Shooters at the 1960 Summer Olympics
Shooters at the 1964 Summer Olympics
Sportspeople from Melbourne
20th-century Australian people